Jocial Tchakounte (born 11 August 1989 in Cameroon) is a Cameroonian professional footballer who is currently a member of Ayeyawady United of the Myanmar National League as of 2018.

Career

Swaziland

A member of Mbabane Swallows squad in 2013, Tchakounte had to go to South Africa for personal reasons in January that year before arriving back in Swaziland in time for the league fixture confronting Malanti Chiefs. The Cameroonian then parted ways with the Swallows in July, with the Times of Swaziland maligning him as 'Arguably the least popular player' in the lineup. This was followed by Mbabane Swallows recalling the defender in early 2014, but he had still not returned by late January and was still in South Africa.

Turkey

Brought in by Ağrı Gençlerbirliği in 2015 with Cameroonian Guillaume N'Kendo in 2015, Tchakounte said he enjoyed the city and its residents upon arrival.

Completed a move to Lapsekispor in 2017.

References

External links
 TFF Profile
 MNL Profile

Association football defenders
1989 births
Expatriate footballers in Eswatini
Cameroonian expatriate footballers
Myanmar National League players
Cameroonian footballers
Living people
Mbabane Swallows players
Expatriate footballers in Turkey
Expatriate footballers in Myanmar
Ayeyawady United F.C. players